Baldwin I may refer to:

Baldwin I of Flanders (died 879)
Baldwin I, Count of Hainaut and shortly Count of Flanders ( 1030 – 1070)
Baldwin I of Jerusalem (1060 – 1118)
Baldwin I of Ramla (died 1138)
Baldwin I of Constantinople (1172–1205)

See also
Baudouin I, King of the Belgians (1930–1993)

ru:Балдуин I